Linn Boyd Benton (1844 in Little Falls, New York – 1932 in Plainfield, New Jersey) was an American typeface designer and inventor of technology for producing metal type.

The son of Congressman Charles S. Benton, he was named for his father's friend Linn Boyd. After starting a career as a book-keeper and working at two newspapers, he became joint owner of Benton, Waldo & Co. Type Foundry and rapidly developed a thorough understanding of typefounding methods that led him to develop new technologies. An 1886 profile described him as "an intelligent, entertaining, unostentatious gentleman, a mechanical genius". Benton's company was one of the original group of companies that merged to form the American Type Founders Company (ATF) in 1892, after which he was a director and chief consultant to ATF.

Benton invented many of the most important type founding technologies of the day, including a mould (1882), self spacing type (1883), a punch cutter (1885), combination fractions (1895), a type dressing machine (1901), a matrix and punch-cutting machine (1906), and automatic type-caster (1907), and a lining device for engraving matrices of shaded letters (1913). One of his most famous inventions was the Benton Pantograph, an engraving machine which not only was capable of scaling a single font design pattern to a variety of sizes, but could also condense, extend, and slant the design.  (Mathematically, these are cases of affine transformation, which is the fundamental geometric operation of most systems of digital typography today, including PostScript.) The technology allowed metal type to be designed on large plan drawings and then cut at the desired size, rather than being hand-engraved at the desired size.

In 1894, at the commission of the publisher of the Century Magazine, Theodore Low De Vinne, he designed his most famous typeface, the original Century.  De Vinne wanted a blacker and more legible face than the typically thin type used before, and slightly condensed to fit the double-column format of the magazine.  It was first used in 1895 and soon became enormously popular and many variations were later designed by his son Morris Fuller Benton.

Typefaces
Century Roman (1894, ATF)
Century Roman Italic (1894, ATF)

References
Cost, Patricia A. "The Bentons: How an American Father and Son Changed the Printing Industry." Rochester, NY: RIT Cary Graphic Arts Press, 2011. .
Rollins, Carl Purlington American Type Designers and Their Work. in Print (magazine), V. 4, #1.
Jaspert, W. Pincus, W. Turner Berry and A.F. Johnson. The Encyclopedia of Type Faces. Blandford Press Lts.: 1953, 1983. .
 MacGrew, Mac, "American Metal Typefaces of the Twentieth Century," Oak Knoll Books, New Castle Delaware, 1993, .
Friedl, Ott, and Stein, Typography: an Encyclopedic Survey of Type Design and Techniques Throughout History. Black Dog & Levinthal Publishers: 1998. .

Citations

External links 
 Linn Boyd Benton, Morris Fuller Benton, and Typemaking at ATF (PDF)

1844 births
1932 deaths
American typographers and type designers
19th-century American inventors
20th-century American inventors
People from Little Falls, New York